Daniel Nestor and Nenad Zimonjić were the defending champions and won in the final after the retirement of Mahesh Bhupathi and Max Mirnyi (while leading 6–3, 2–0).

Seeds
All seeds receive a bye into the second round.

Draw

Finals

Top half

Bottom half

References
 Doubles Draw

Doubles